Kruppel-like factor 13, also known as KLF13, is a protein that in humans is encoded by the KLF13 gene.  

There is some evidence for KLF13 having a role in obesity.  A methylation site, cg07814318, within the first intron of KLF13 has been associated with obesity and orexigenic processes.  Ghrelin levels also positively correlated with methylation levels of cg07814318.  Moreover, expression levels of KLF13 were decreased and increased in the brains of starved and obese mice, respectively.

Function 

KLF13 belongs to a family of transcription factors that contain 3 classical zinc finger DNA-binding domains consisting of a zinc atom tetrahedrally coordinated by 2 cysteines and 2 histidines (C2H2 motif). These transcription factors bind to GC-rich sequences and related GT and CACCC boxes.

KLF13 was first described as the RANTES factor of late activated T lymphocytes (RFLAT)-1.  It regulates the expression of the chemokine RANTES in T lymphocytes.  It functions as a lynchpin, inducing a large enhancesome.  KLF13 knock-out mice show a defect in lymphocyte survival as KLF13 is a regulator of Bcl-xL expression.

Interactions 

KLF13 has been shown to interact with CREB-binding protein, Heat shock protein 47 and PCAF.

See also 
 Kruppel-like factors

References

Further reading

External links 
 

Transcription factors